Ruden may refer to:

 Ruden, Austria, town in Austria
 Ruden (island), island in Germany
 Haus zum Rüden, the guildhall of the Gesellschaft zur Constaffel in Zürich, Switzerland